There are two species of skink named north-eastern orange-tailed slider:

 Lerista orientalis, found in the Northern Territory and Queensland in Australia
 Lerista zonulata, found in Queensland in Australia

Reptile common names